Maslov or Maslow is a Russian masculine surname originating from the word maslo (butter); its feminine counterpart is Maslova or Maslowa. The surname may refer to the following people:
Abraham Maslow (1908–1970), American psychologist
Maslow's hierarchy of needs, a theory in psychology
Aleksandr Maslov (born 1969), Russian football coach and former player
Aleksey Maslov (born 1966), Russian alpine skier
Alexey Maslov (1953–2022), Russian Ground Forces general, former commander-in-chief of the Ground Forces
Arkadi Maslow (1891–1941), German communist politician
Darya Maslova (born 1995), Kyrgyzstani long-distance runner
Eugene Maslov (1945–2011), Russian billiards coach
Igor Maslov (born 1995), Russian football player
James Maslow (born 1990), American actor and singer
Jonathan Maslow (1948–2008), American journalist and author
Leonid Maslov (born 1935), Lithuanian and Uzbekistani chess master
Nina Maslova (born 1946), Russian actress
Pavel Maslov (born 2000), Russian football player
Petr Maslov (economist)
Petr Maslov (born 1962), Russian graphic and installation artist
Sergey Maslov (disambiguation), multiple people
Sophie Maslow (1911–2006), American choreographer, modern dancer and teacher
Steve Maslow (born 1944), American sound engineer
Valeriia Maslova (born 2001), Russian handball player 
Victor Maslov (disambiguation), multiple people
Vladimir Maslov (1941–1998), Russian film and theatrical director
Walter Maslow (born 1926), American film and television actor
Will Maslow (1907–2007), American lawyer and civil rights leader 
Yevgeni Maslov (born 1966), Russian football coach and a former player

See also
Maslova Pristan, an urban-type settlement in Belgorod Oblast, Russia

Surnames
Russian-language surnames